Joseph Mathews may refer to:
 Joseph William Mathews, English horticulturist and gardener
 Joseph Howard Mathews, American physical chemist

See also
 Joseph Matthews (disambiguation)
 Joe Matthews (disambiguation)